Nomadic Massive is an independent Canadian hip hop supergroup based in Montreal, active since 2004. They have achieved fame in Canada, the United States, Brazil, and France, among other international venues. The membership of the band varies with each song, but their ensemble includes rappers, singers, keyboardists, saxophonists, trumpeters, trombonists, guitarists, bass players, and drummers. Many of the musicians are multi-instrumentalists and trade spots onstage. The group's official members are vocalists Waahli, Taliwah (a.k.a. iamblackgirl), Meryem Saci, and Lou Piensa, as well as musicians Butta Beats and Ali Sepu. With lyrics in diverse languages, including English, French, Creole, Spanish, and Arabic, Nomadic Massive celebrates global music interpreted through an Afro-Latin twist with hip hop as the main medium of expression. They have been a staple of the Montreal International Jazz Festival for several years.

Band biography
In 2004, the collective made up of solo artists was created in Montreal in order to participate in a hip-hop festival in Havana, Cuba. After spending three weeks living together with music as the main focus and sharing strong moments with Cuban artists, the group came back to Montreal with the idea of putting together a mixtape and a show in order to showcase their experience. The night of the concert, the venue quickly packed up and the mixtapes rapidly sold-out. The next day, Nomadic Massive, surprised by the massive turn-out, decided to push the experience even further by participating in any community shows between Montreal and Toronto.

In 2005, the group launched its first EP, entitled Nomad’s Land. The record was critically acclaimed in the local and international scene, and thanks to their dynamic shows, Nomadic Massive started to create its own niche. The first single from the EP, "Nofy’s Peace", stood out because of its production quality, as well as its naturally universal feel. To this day, more than 3000 copies have been sold, mostly at shows.

After this first record and these first shows, the group continued to perform at various events across Canada and even returned to Havana in 2006, to present their new material and their new live show. As contacts kept on multiplying, the group managed in 2008 to independently organize a tour in São Paulo, Brazil where their music and community workshops found a new fan base and where they produced a new mixtape with local artists. These out of the ordinary moves caught the attention of Outside Music, who in 2009 offered Nomadic a national distribution deal for their second self-titled album, which sold more than 4500 copies.

In 2012, the group released a mixtape project entitled Supafam, which came out digitally but also on 300 exclusive cassette tapes that were rapidly sold at the launch party. During that time, the group continued to tour in new territories, such as French Guiana and the United States.

The arrival of a new EP in 2013 announced the beginning of an intense tour across Canada, the United States and France, inciting the attention of the various buyers in the concert industry.

In 2016, after years of international touring, the Nomads left their mark on the genre’s most avid fans as they launched a new album on the Coop Les Faux-Monnayeurs label entitled The Big Band Theory, a well-received musical trip into an organic international universe tinted with soul, jazz and funk. 
This album allowed them to open-up new markets, particularly in Europe and Latin America.

Having entered their 15th year as a group, Nomadic Massive proved itself to be a true mirror of today’s big cities and the cultural blend they generate. An archetype band of the 21st century, Nomadic represents a local reality but with its eyes on the rest of the world.

Performance highlights

 Celebrate Brooklyn! (New York, NY)
 Grand Performances (Los Angeles, CA)
 Webster Hall (New York, NY)
 Festival International de Jazz (Montréal, QC)
 Paléo Festival (Nyon, Switzerland)
 Havana World Festival (Havana, Cuba)
 Say it Loud Festival (Barcelona, Spain)
 Vancouver International Jazz Festival (Vancouver, BC)
 Calgary Folk Festival (Calgary, AB)
 Lotus Festival (Bloomington, IN)
 TFF Festival (Rudolstadt, Germany)
 Pan-Am Games (Toronto, ON)
 Festival international de la Francophonie (Lafayette, LA)
 Kennedy Center (Washington, D.C.)
 Les Printemps de Bourges (Bourges, France)
 Festival Transamazoniennes (French Guiana) and more.

Members

Nantali Indongo 
Nantali Indongo (who also goes by Tali, IamBlackgirl, IBG or Taliwah) is a Caribbean singer, songwriter and MC. Indongo studied literature at the University of Ottawa, and received a graduate certificate in journalism from Humber College. She is also the daughter of activist Kennedy Frederick, who was one of the six original plaintiffs and a leader in the infamous Sir George Williams Affair, a series of protests held at Sir George Williams University (now Concordia University) in the 1960s, after the administration failed to address students’ claims that a professor at the school, Perry Anderson, was guilty of racism; these events make the subject of the 2015 documentary film Ninth Floor, in which Indongo stars.

Indongo is also the co-founder of Hip Hop No Pop, an educational and interactive workshop series that looks at the non-violent origins of hip hop culture and uses hip hop as a tool to encourage storytelling and foster confidence in youth. She currently sits on the board Maison des Jeunes de la Côte-des-Neiges as well.

Indongo is also a researcher and reporter for CBC Radio Montréal.

Lou Piensa 
Lou Piensa is a French-born MC, producer and educator. Active in the international hip-hop scene since his teenage years, Piensa has been involved in many aspects of the movement including radio, music production, performance, and events organization. His music had him travel and share the stage with world renowned artists (Common, Wyclef Jean, Dead Prez, K'naan, Julian Marley), particularly with Nomadic Massive. Piensa's raps mix the languages he speaks (French, English, Spanish and Portuguese), a perfect match for Côte-des-Neiges, where he lives.

His nomadic childhood (Born in France, he grew up in Ecuador, Algeria, Canada and Cuba) has given him an ability to adapt with ease and has fueled his international vision of hip-hop culture. His production reflects an eclectic musical upbringing, finding inspiration in all rhythms of the world, using hip-hop's fervor as its main thread.

Lou Piensa is one half of The Loop Pilots, a collaborative beatmaking duo founded in 2015 with his former English student and established producer Dr. MaD.

In 2007,  NoBad Sound Studio, a music studio for youths 18 and under, was founded in affiliation with Maison des Jeunes Côte-des-Neiges, where Piensa, alongside bandmate Butta Beats, were hired to conduct workshops.

In 2016, the two would help create Up Next Studio at James Lyng High School.

Waahli 
Waahli (also known as Wyzah) was born in Montreal to Haitian parents. His father a musician as well, Waahli knew at an early age that music would play an intricate part of his life. Solo artist and member of Nomadic Massive, he is a self-taught jack of many trades such as rapping, freestyling, and playing guitar. Waahli has shared the stage with acts such as Guru, Antibalas, Yasiin Bey, Georgia Anne Muldrow, Blackalicious, K’naan and Wyclef Jean. His musical styles and influences range from traditional, to soul, funk and jazz. He gravitates to the conscious sounds of Native Tongues and affiliates.  He has cited the Jungle Brothers, A Tribe Called Quest, De La Soul, J Dilla, and KRS-One as inspirations. Beyond his musical influences, Waahli also derives inspiration from the work of Black activists such as Dr. Martin Luther King, Jr. and Malcolm X. More recently he has been exploring his skills as a beatmaker, releasing the instrumental EP series Soapfactory Volumes 1 (2011) and 2 (2012), which he has showcased at Artbeat Montreal Revelation in 2012.

Waahli is also a father, a grassroots community builder, youth worker and a soap maker (Wyzah Musk).

Ali Sepu 
Ali Sepu is an Ottawa-born musician. Sepu has been in the music scene since the age of twelve. It was then that he received his first guitar from his father. He proceeded to become involved in many Chilean cultural events which served as a training ground for his unique guitar style. He was influenced by the traditional music of the Andes, as well as the blues and the psychedelic music of the 70s. He eventually discovered that there was a place for his style in the hip-hop genre, where his loops could replace the traditional sample. Hip-hop expanded his musical repertoire as he explored new styles emanating from the diverse cultures in the Montreal music scene. Although his original loops were done on the same classical guitar he received as a child, he opted for a Japanese Stratocaster when the group decided to go with a live band. The electrification of his original sound is what allowed for the evolution into what is now the signature nomadic sound.

Meryem Saci 
Meryem Saci (also known as Meduza Ma’at) is an Algerian singer, songwriter and MC. Saci was born in Algiers, Algeria and immigrated to Canada in 2000 to escape civil war. Fluent in Arabic and French, she learned English through long hours of religiously listening to Wu-Tang Clan, Big L, Fugees, Public Enemy, Dead Prez and other influential hip-hop artists. Her love for hip-hop comes from the genre’s tradition of encouraging social critique and free speech. She joined Nomadic Massive in 2005 after recognizing the group’s passion for music and positive social change.

While mentoring young women and facilitating singing workshops at La Maison des Jeunes de Côte-des-Neiges, she obtained a degree in commerce, a license in real estate, and began her bachelor's degree in political science. As a singer, she has collaborated on soundtracks for films and TV shows Lance et Compte, On the Beat (Sur le rythme), Omertà, Dérapage and more, adding the Netflix Marvel Original Iron Fist to the list in 2017. Saci released her debut single “Concrete Jungle” in March 2017; her debut solo album, On My Way, was released on June 1, 2017.

Butta Beats 

Butta Beats is an Argentinian beat-boxer, emcee, multi-instrumentalist, producer, songwriter and educator. Butta Beats was often seen and heard in countless freestyle sessions and beat-boxing encounters in concerts, on street corners and on the radio. He was part of the WEFUNK Radio with DJ Static and Professor Groove. He also collaborated with Ali Sepu on the Iron Chef Project, which allowed him to integrate his South American folkloric influences with occidental urban music. Joining Nomadic Massive gave him the perfect medium to express positive social discourse through music.

In 2007, NoBad Sound Studio, a music studio for youths 18 and under, was founded in affiliation with Maison des Jeunes Côte-des-Neiges, where Butta Beats, alongside bandmate Piensa, were hired to conduct workshops.

In 2016, the two would help create Up Next Studio at James Lyng High School.

Satellite members

Rawgged MC 
Born in Port-au-Prince, Haiti, Diegal Leger moved to Montreal in 1982.  Between two academic diplomas he will become Rawgged MC. He is a founder of the Students for the Advancement of Hip Hop Culture at Concordia University, responsible for the symposium on hip-hop culture that was held in Montreal from 2002 to 2005 and again in 2009; and in Port-au-Prince in September 2011. Leger is also a founding member of Solid’Ayiti, an association dedicated to cooperation between artistic and academic communities in Montreal and Haiti. He continues his parallel evolution in the worlds of medicine and music.

His private podiatry practice, Leger Foot Clinic, is expanding while Nomadic Massive is gaining steady momentum. He also plays bass in fellow Nomadic Massive bandmate Vox Sambou's solo project.

DJ Static 
DJ Static (born Michael Lai in 1977) is a well-known Canadian DJ and radio personality.

He arrived in 1988 from Hong Kong, settling first in Vancouver, British Columbia, then in Montreal. He credits hip hop music with helping him learn English[2], and started DJing in 1994.

In 1996, in collaboration with fellow Canadian DJ Professor Groove, he launched the award-winning WEFUNK weekly radio show on Montreal's CKUT 90.3, McGill University's radio station.

Since 1999, the show is also available online through WEFUNK Radio. Both DJs play a symbiotic mix of Funk, Soul, R&B and Rap, both old and new. The name of the radio show comes from the Parliaments' song "P. Funk (Wants To Get Funked Up)", in which WEFUNK is a fictional radio station broadcasting "directly from the Mothership, top of the Chocolate Milky Way, 500,000 kilowatts of P Funk-power." The Internet radio stream in 1999, becoming one of the oldest continuously operating radio streams on the Internet, as well as one of the longest-running online radio shows.

DJ Static became DJ for the Canadian multicultural multilingual hip-hop group Nomadic Massive. The members of the band come from Haiti, Algeria, Iraq, China, Argentina, Chile and France.

In addition to his radio work and work with Nomadic Massive, he has club residencies in Blizzarts and Boa in Montreal. At various times, he has DJed internationally including various American and Canadian venues, Cuba, Hong Kong and Zurich.

Hest One 
Hest One is a Paris-born graffiti artist who has also lived in Montreal, Jakarta, Indonesia and Saint-Louis, Réunion. Having made his name in the underground of Paris's 1980s and 1990s graffiti scene, he moved to Montreal at the turn of the century and, as part of NME crew in Montreal, he has left his mark as one of the most respected graff artists in the city. As an original member of Nomadic Massive, his art has blessed the covers of every Nomadic Massive albums and logos as well as some of their early show flyers.

Past members

Vox Sambou 
Vox Sambou was born in Limbe, Haiti. He has been composing and performing for over 15 years. He sings in Creole, English, French and Spanish. He holds a bachelor's degree in Psychology and Anthropology. For more than 10 years he ran the Maison des Jeunes de la Côte-des-Neiges, a non-profit organization whose mandate is to prevent delinquency among adolescents in Côte-des-Neiges. Sambou, as a solo artist, has always incorporated socially conscious themes since his first album Lakay, which was released in 2008. He continues with Dyasporafriken, his second solo album, combining reggae sounds and traditional Haitian music. Sambou has launched several video clips, including "DiscriminaSida", on World AIDS Day, as well as "Article 14", in collaboration with Narcy and Professor Noam Chomsky. Most recently, Sambou launched his video "Tout Moun" featuring Malika Tirolien and Kaytranada. His latest release The Brasil Sessions incorporates songs from his live show, fully recorded in Brazil with his musicians, with whom he has toured across the Americas as well as in Europe, Africa and Asia.

Sambou has been instrumental in the implementation of educational and community projects based in Limbe. He is a founding member of SOLID'AYITI, an initiative of artists and activists working for long-term solidarity between Montrealers and the movement fighting for social justice in Haiti, according to the principles of self-sufficiency, education, decentralization, and reforestation.

Sayen 
Sayen is a Chilean-Canadian singer with influences ranging from R&B, to Latin Jazz and folkloric music. Based in Ottawa, she now performs regularly alongside Afro-Cuban jazzman Miguel de Armas and his musicians.

Mentorship

NoBad Sound Studio 
Ex-member Vox Sambou sat as director of the Maison Des Jeunes Côte-des-Neiges youth center for 10 years. The youth center is located in the Côte-des-Neiges neighborhood, part of the Côte-des-Neiges–Notre-Dame-de-Grâce borough, the most populous and culturally diverse of Montreal. In 2007, Butta Beats and Lou Piensa would be brought on by the Maison des Jeunes to facilitate workshops in the new NoBad Sound Studio, just under their own rehearsal studio. NoBad Sound Studio, affiliated with the Maison des Jeunes, was developed with the intention to offer to young budding musicians a place where they can develop their musical talents and express themselves artistically. The space offers neighborhood youth a wide variety of music workshops each week that include beat-boxing, rap, speech writing, singing lessons, music production, DJing and performance skills.

In 2009, the studio began producing professional-quality music published on CD. This initiative offered young artists the opportunity to work directly with professional staff to create, record and develop musical projects that express socially conscious lyrics. In 2010, the studio began expanding its activities outside of Montreal, which gave them the opportunity to bring 5 youths to Toronto, ON, after being invited to play and speak at the Regent Park International Film Festival. The studio intends to create international exchanges with marginalized youth around the world in the near future.

In 2014, NBS launched their first all-girl initiative, with the result being a trio of singers, songwriters and beatmakers, Strange Froots. As the most successful act to have come out of NBS to date, Sambou would go on to call them "the pride of NoBad Sound Studio and of the Maison des Jeunes", in an interview with France Ô and Outre-Mer 1ère.

Strange Froots 
Strange Froots, founded in 2014, is the first all-girl group to have formed at NBS. The group, composed of Mags, Naïka Champaïgne (having attended NBS since 2013), and SageS (from 2014 to 2020), takes their name from the Billie Holiday song "Strange Fruit". As Nomadic Massive's protégés, they have made waves in the Montreal hip-hop scene, having released their eponymous first EP at the Hip Hop You Don't Stop festival in September 2014 with Tali as one of the fellow acts, only 3 months after their first meeting. Tali, Waahli and Piensa would open for their first music video launch in February 2015. Since their inception, they have performed in many different venues and festivals across Montreal, such as WE Day, the St-Ambroise Montreal Fringe Festival, POP Montreal and RIDM.  Their second EP, Blossom This Froot For Thought, was released in July 2016, through Concordia University's official campus and community radio station CJLO, by way of their OnRotation artist residency. The second EP has charted across Canada in the top 10 in hip-hop for most of Fall 2016 On Campus and Community radio. The group would announce in spring of 2021 that SageS was no longer part of the band.

Discography

Albums 
Nomad's Land (2006)
Nomadic Massive (2009)
The Big Band Theory (2016)
Times (2019)

EPs 
Nomads Land EP (2005)
Any Sound (2013)

Mixtapes 
The Canada-Cuba Get-Down (2004)
The Brazil-Canada Get-down (2008)
The Radio-Tape (2015)

References

External links 
 http://www.kennedy-center.org/artist/B66906
 http://www.montrealjazzfest.com/artists/artist.aspx?id=350
 http://www.festivalnuitsdafrique.com/en/artist/nomadic-massive

Musical groups from Montreal
Canadian world music groups
Canadian hip hop groups
Musical groups established in 2004
2004 establishments in Quebec